William Walker (13 November 1871 – 23 January 1907) was a Scottish footballer who played as an inside right.

He played for various sides, including Broxburn, Leith Athletic, and Liverpool in the 1897–98 season. He died aged 35 as a result of being kicked in the stomach during a match between Leith Athletic and Vale of Leven in Edinburgh.

References

Scottish footballers
Liverpool F.C. players
1871 births
1907 deaths
Leith Athletic F.C. players
Broxburn United F.C. players
People from Broxburn, West Lothian
Association football inside forwards
Scottish Football League players
English Football League players
Scottish Junior Football Association players
Association football players who died while playing
Sport deaths in Scotland
People from Uphall